The 2002 FIFA World Cup qualification UEFA Group 1 was a UEFA qualifying group for the 2002 FIFA World Cup. The group comprised Faroe Islands, Luxembourg, Russia, Slovenia, Switzerland and Yugoslavia.

The group was won by Russia, who qualified for the 2002 FIFA World Cup. The runners-up Slovenia entered the UEFA play-off stage.

Standings

Results

Goalscorers

7 goals

 Vladimir Beschastnykh
 Kubilay Türkyilmaz

6 goals

 Savo Milošević

5 goals

 Alexander Frei
 Mateja Kežman

4 goals

 Zlatko Zahovič

3 goals

 Yegor Titov

2 goals

 Dmitri Khokhlov
 Milenko Ačimovič
 Nastja Čeh
 Željko Milinovič
 Milan Osterc
 Stéphane Chapuisat
 Slaviša Jokanović
 Siniša Mihajlović
 Predrag Mijatović
 Dejan Stanković

1 goal

 Uni Arge
 Jens Kristian Hansen
 Øssur Hansen
 Christian Høgni Jacobsen
 Kurt Mørkøre
 John Petersen
 Marcel Christophe
 René Peters
 Sacha Schneider
 Jeff Strasser
 Dmitri Alenichev
 Maksim Buznikin
 Yuri Kovtun
 Aleksandr Mostovoi
 Sergei Semak
 Aleksandr Shirko
 Sebastjan Cimirotič
 Aleksander Knavs
 Ermin Šiljak
 Senad Tiganj
 Sašo Udovič
 Sébastien Fournier
 Johann Lonfat
 Hakan Yakin
 Marco Zwyssig
 Predrag Đorđević
 Miroslav Đukić
 Mladen Krstajić

Notes

References

External links
FIFA official page
RSSSF - 2002 World Cup Qualification
Allworldcup

1
2000 in Russian football
2001 in Russian football
Qual
2000 in Faroe Islands football
2001 in Faroe Islands football
2000–01 in Swiss football
2001–02 in Swiss football
2000–01 in Slovenian football
Qual
2000–01 in Luxembourgian football
2001–02 in Luxembourgian football
2000–01 in Yugoslav football
2001–02 in Yugoslav football